John Page (1696? – 1779) of Watergate House, near Chichester, Sussex was an English Member of Parliament.

He was the son of Edward Page of Chichester and began his working life as an employee of the South Sea Company. From 1730 to 1732 he was a Director of the East India Company.

He entered Parliament in 1727 as the member for Great Grimsby, sitting until 1734. In the next Parliament (1934) he stood for Chichester but came bottom of the poll. In 1741, however, he was elected for the borough, sitting in several successive Parliaments until 1768.

In 1733 he became a trustee for the newly formed colony of Georgia on the east coast of America.

He died in 1779. He had married twice; firstly Catherine, the daughter of Robert Knight, cashier of the South Sea Co., with whom he had a daughter and secondly, in 1741, Anne, the daughter and heiress of Francis Soane of Stockbridge, near Chichester, with whom he had a second daughter.

See also
 Trustees for the Establishment of the Colony of Georgia in America

References

|-

1690s births
1779 deaths
People from Chichester
Directors of the British East India Company
Members of the Parliament of Great Britain for Great Grimsby
British MPs 1727–1734
British MPs 1741–1747
British MPs 1747–1754
British MPs 1754–1761
British MPs 1761–1768
Year of birth uncertain